A blog is a website where entries are written in chronological order and commonly displayed in reverse chronological order.

Blog may also refer to:
 Blog 27, a Polish musical group fronted by Tola Szlagowska
 BladeLogic, formerly the NYSE symbol for the software company acquired by BMC Software
 .blog, a proposed generic top-level domain intended for use by blogs

See also 
 Vlog, a form of blogging for which the medium is video
 Moblog, a method of publishing to a website or blog from a mobile phone